Mangle can refer to:

 Mangle (machine), a mechanical laundry aid consisting of two rollers
 Box mangle, an earlier laundry mangle using rollers and a heavy weight
 Mangled packet, in computing
 Mangrove, woody trees or shrubs
 Name mangling, in computing
 Mangle, an animatronic from Five Nights at Freddy's 2

See also
 Mangel (disambiguation)
 Mangles (disambiguation)